Christian Keller may refer to:

Christian Keller (born 1972), a German Olympic swimmer
Christian Keller (sports administrator) (born 1976), a German academic and sports administrator
Christian Keller (footballer) (born 1980), a Danish footballer